Liatris pycnostachya, the prairie blazing star, cattail gayfeather or cattail blazing star, is a perennial plant in the Asteraceae family that is native to the tallgrass prairies of the central United States.

Description
They grow both from the root and in great numbers on the flower stems, becoming progressively smaller higher up the stem. Each flower head has 5 to 8 florets and is surrounded by overlapping pinkish bracts (phyllaries) whose tips are pointed and curve backwards. The stems, leaves, and bracts may be smooth or hairy to varying degrees. The shape of the bracts distinguishes this species from others, for example Liatris spicata, another tall Liatris species that has thickly packed spikes, but whose bracts are flat with rounded tips.

The root system is a corm that sometimes develops into a rhizome. It produces offsets and gradually forms a clump.

Etymology
The species epithet comes from Ancient Greek  "dense" and  "ear of grain", referring to the thickly packed spike of flowers.

Distribution and habitat
Its native habitats include prairies, open woods, and meadows.

Ecology
The plant attracts birds, hummingbirds, and butterflies.  It is a larval host to the bleeding flower moth (Schinia sanguinea).

References

External links

pycnostachya
Flora of the United States
Flora of North America